The Comanche County Courthouse in Coldwater, Kansas was built in 1927.  It was listed on the National Register of Historic Places in 2002.

The building replaced a wood-frame courthouse from c.1890 which was destroyed by a fire in 1921.

It is a four-story masonry building with buff brick and limestone trimmings.  It was designed by Routledge & Hertz in Classical Revival style.  It was built by contractor Thomas Howard.

References

External links

Government buildings on the National Register of Historic Places in Kansas
Neoclassical architecture in Kansas
Government buildings completed in 1927
Comanche County, Kansas